Princess Palatine Benedicta Henrietta (Benedicta Henrietta Philippina; 14 March 1652 – 12 August 1730) was Duchess of Brunswick-Lüneburg, or of Hanover, by her marriage to Duke John Frederick. She was the third and youngest daughter of Prince Palatine Edward and the political hostess Anna Gonzaga.

Life
Born in Paris to the landless Prince Palatine Edward, Bénédicte Henriette'''s paternal grandparents were Frederick V, Elector Palatine and Elizabeth Stuart, the Winter Queen. Her maternal grandparents were Charles I, Duke of Mantua and Montferrat and his French wife Catherine de Mayenne, daughter of Charles de Lorraine-Guise, Duke of Mayenne. She was the youngest of three daughters.

Bénédicte was reared by Louise de La Fayette, a courtier-turned-nun known as Sister Louise-Angélique.

Duchess of Brunswick-Lüneburg
She was married at the age of sixteen to a distant cousin, John Frederick, Duke of Brunswick-Lüneburg, who was the same age as her father, and childless. They were married on 30 November 1668. The union, which had been arranged by the French diplomatist Gourville, produced four daughters, only two of whom lived to mature adulthood.

John Frederick died in 1679 without a male heir, and the duchy of Brunswick was inherited by his Protestant younger brother, Ernest Augustus, the husband of Benedicta Henrietta's paternal aunt, Sophia of Hanover, and father of George I of Great Britain. After her husband's death, Benedicta returned to her native France and resided there with her sister, the princess of Condé.

She corresponded with Gottfried Leibniz.

Benedicta died the age of 78, at Asnieres, her late sister's residence near Paris, on 12 August 1730.

Issue
Anna Sophie of Brunswick-Lüneburg (10 February 1670 – 24 March 1672), died in childhood;
Charlotte Felizitas of Brunswick-Lüneburg (8 March 1671 – 29 September 1710), married Rinaldo d'Este, Duke of Modena and had issue;
Henriette Maria of Brunswick-Lüneburg (9 March 1672 – 4 September 1687), died unmarried;
Wilhelmine Amalia of Brunswick-Lüneburg (21 April 1673 – 10 April 1742), married Joseph I, Holy Roman Emperor and had issue.

Ancestry

References

Sources
Bougaud, Emile. St. Chantal and the Foundation of the Visitation. Vol. 2. New York: Benziger Brothers, 1895. Google Books''. Web.

1652 births
1730 deaths
Nobility from Paris
17th-century French women
18th-century French women
17th-century German women
House of Hanover
House of Palatinate-Simmern
Duchesses of Brunswick-Lüneburg